Stolyarovka is a rural locality (a village) in Zirgansky Selsoviet, Meleuzovsky District, Bashkortostan, Russia. The population was 10 as of 2010. There are 4 streets.

Geography 
Stolyarovka is located 45 km north of Meleuz (the district's administrative centre) by road. Semyonovka is the nearest rural locality.

References 

Rural localities in Meleuzovsky District